Bharathidasan Government College for Women (French: Collège gouvernemental Bharathidasan pour femmes) is a women's general degree college located in Muthialpet, Puducherry. It was established in the year 1968. The college is affiliated with Pondicherry University. This college offers different courses in arts, commerce and science.

Under Graduate Programmes offered

Science
Physics
Chemistry
Mathematics
Botany
Zoology
Clinical Nutrition and Dietics
Computer Science

Arts and Commerce
Tamil
English
French
History
Economics
Commerce
Corporate Secretaryship

Accreditation
The college is  recognized by the University Grants Commission (UGC).
Reaccredited by NAAC with 'B'
Autonomous College affiliated to Pondicherry University

References

External links
http://bgcw.py.gov.in/
Bharathidasan Government College Photo

Universities and colleges in Puducherry
Educational institutions established in 1968
1968 establishments in Pondicherry
Colleges affiliated to Pondicherry University
Academic institutions formerly affiliated with the University of Madras